Parinaquta (Aymara parina flamingo, quta lake "flamingo lake", hispanicized spelling Parinajota) is a lake in the Andes of Peru. It is situated in the Puno Region, Carabaya Province, Macusani District, north-east of Macusani. Parinaquta lies south of the lake Sayt'uquta (Aymara for "prolonged, lengthened or tapering lake", hispanicized Saytojota) at the road between Ayapata and Macusani.

See also
List of lakes in Peru

References

Lakes of Peru
Lakes of Puno Region